The Port of Liverpool is the enclosed  dock system that runs from Brunswick Dock in Liverpool to Seaforth Dock, Seaforth, on the east side of the River Mersey and the Birkenhead Docks between Birkenhead and Wallasey on the west side of the river.  The port was extended in 2016 by the building of an in-river container terminal at Seaforth Dock, named Liverpool2. The terminal can berth two 14,000 container Post-Panamax ships.

Garston Docks, which are in the city of Liverpool, are not a part of the Port of Liverpool. The working docks are operated by Mersey Docks and Harbour Company, the docks to the south of the Pier Head are operated by the Canal & River Trust, the successor to former operator British Waterways.

History 

Liverpool's first dock was the world's first enclosed commercial dock, the Old Dock, built in 1715. The Lyver Pool, a tidal inlet in the narrows of the estuary, which is now largely under the Liverpool One shopping centre, was converted into the enclosed dock. Further docks were added and eventually all were interconnected by lock gates, extending  along the Liverpool bank of the River Mersey. From 1830 onwards, most of the building stone was granite from Kirkmabreck near Creetown, Scotland.

The interconnected dock system was the most advanced port system in the world. The docks enabled ship movements within the dock system 24 hours a day, isolated from the high River Mersey tides. Parts of the system were a World Heritage Site from 2004 until 2021.

From 1885, the dock system was the hub of a hydraulic power network that stretched beyond the docks.

Most of the smaller south end docks were closed in 1971 with Brunswick Dock remaining until closure in 1975. Many docks have been filled in to create land for buildings: at the Pier Head, an arena at Kings Dock, commercial estates at Toxteth and Harrington Docks and housing at Herculaneum Dock.  In the north, some branch docks have been filled in to create land. Sandon and Wellington Docks have been filled in and are now the location of a sewage works.  Most of Hornby Dock was filled in to allow Gladstone Dock's coal terminal to expand.

The largest dock on the dock network, Seaforth Dock, was opened in 1972 and deals with grain and containers, accommodating what were the largest containers ships at that time.

Both White Star Line and Cunard Line were based at the port.

In 1972, Canadian Pacific unit CP Ships was the last transatlantic line to operate from Liverpool.
In 2004 UNESCO announced Liverpool Maritime Mercantile City.

Port statistics 

In 2020 Liverpool was the United Kingdom's fourth largest port by tonnage of freight, handling 31.1 million tonnes.

Marina

Liverpool Marina is in Coburg Dock and has 340 berths.

Cruise terminal

Cruise ships once sailed from Langton Dock, part of the enclosed north docks system. Departures and arrivals were subject to tides. Cruise ships returned to Liverpool's Pier Head in 2008, berthing at a newly constructed cruise terminal, enabling departures and arrivals at any time. Until 2012, any cruises beginning in Liverpool still departed from Langton Dock but, since 2012, the terminal has been used as the start and end of voyages, and not merely a stop-off point. This led to a dispute with Southampton due to the large public subsidy provided for the new terminal, which Liverpool City Council has agreed to repay.
 
Ships which have called at Liverpool Cruise Terminal include Queen Elizabeth 2 (QE2), Grand Princess, Caribbean Princess and RMS Queen Mary 2.

Rail connections

At one point the Mersey Docks and Harbour Company freight railway totalled  of rail track, with connections to many other railways. A section of freight rail line ran under the Liverpool Overhead passenger railway, with trains constantly crossing the Dock Road from the docks into the freight terminals. Today, only the Canada Dock branch line is used to serve the docks, using diesel locomotives.

The first rail link to the docks was the construction of the 1830 Park Lane railway goods station opposite the Queen's Dock in the south of the city. The terminal was accessed via the  Wapping Tunnel from Edge Hill rail junction in the east of the city. The station was demolished in 1972. The tunnel is still intact.

Until 1971, Liverpool Riverside railway station served the liner terminal at the Pier Head. Today, for passengers disembarking from the new cruise terminal, city centre circular buses call at the terminal directly, while Moorfields and James Street are the nearest Merseyrail stations.

On the opposite side of the river, the Birkenhead Dock Branch served the docks between 1847 and 1993. This route remains intact, albeit disused.

Quotes about Liverpool docks

Image gallery

See also
Isle of Man Steam Packet
List of Liverpool Docks
Twelve Quays
Port of Liverpool Building
Architecture of Liverpool

References

External links

Port of Liverpool Official Website
 UKHO nautical charts of Liverpool Docks and approaches via Queens and Crosby Channels
'Liverpool: The docks', A History of the County of Lancaster: Volume 4 (1911), pp. 41-43.    Date accessed: 16 November 2009.
The Port of Liverpool In Camera
Historic map of railways in Liverpool
 Select Committee on Environment, Transport and Regional Affairs: Memorandum by Merseytravel

 
Transport in Liverpool
Peel Ports
Mersey docks
Economy of Liverpool